This is a list of fellows of the Royal Society elected in 1691.

Fellows 
Thomas Day  (1656–1696)
Louis Paule  (1691–1702)
Sir Godfrey Copley  (1653–1709)
Alexander Torriano  (1667–1717)
Luigi Ferdinand Marsigli, Count (1658–1730)

References

1691
1691 in science
1691 in England